The Dzerzhinsk constituency (No.119) was a Russian legislative constituency in the Nizhny Novgorod Oblast in 1993–2007. The constituency covered western Nizhny Novgorod Oblast, including Dzerzhinsk and Pavlovo. In 2016 Nizhny Novgorod Oblast lost one of its constituencies and Dzerzhinsk constituency was partitioned between Avtozavodsky and Kanavinsky constituencies.

Members elected

Election Results

1993

|-
! colspan=2 style="background-color:#E9E9E9;text-align:left;vertical-align:top;" |Candidate
! style="background-color:#E9E9E9;text-align:left;vertical-align:top;" |Party
! style="background-color:#E9E9E9;text-align:right;" |Votes
! style="background-color:#E9E9E9;text-align:right;" |%
|-
|style="background-color:"|
|align=left|Mikhail Seslavinsky
|align=left|Independent
|
|32.91%
|-
|style="background-color:"|
|align=left|Aleksandr Fyodorov
|align=left|Independent
|
|11.95%
|-
|style="background-color:"|
|align=left|Sergey Maslagin
|align=left|Independent
|
|10.95%
|-
|style="background-color:"|
|align=left|Anatoly Tarasov
|align=left|Independent
|
|7.98%
|-
|style="background-color:"|
|align=left|Mikhail Stepanov
|align=left|Independent
|
|5.90%
|-
|style="background-color:#DBB726"|
|align=left|Sergey Tsvetov
|align=left|Democratic Party
|
|4.57%
|-
|style="background-color:#E9E26E"|
|align=left|Vladimir Yershov
|align=left|Russian Democratic Reform Movement
|
|4.56%
|-
|style="background-color:"|
|align=left|Nikolay Katkov
|align=left|Yavlinsky–Boldyrev–Lukin
|
|2.94%
|-
|style="background-color:#000000"|
|colspan=2 |against all
|
|14.53%
|-
| colspan="5" style="background-color:#E9E9E9;"|
|- style="font-weight:bold"
| colspan="3" style="text-align:left;" | Total
| 
| 100%
|-
| colspan="5" style="background-color:#E9E9E9;"|
|- style="font-weight:bold"
| colspan="4" |Source:
|
|}

1995

|-
! colspan=2 style="background-color:#E9E9E9;text-align:left;vertical-align:top;" |Candidate
! style="background-color:#E9E9E9;text-align:left;vertical-align:top;" |Party
! style="background-color:#E9E9E9;text-align:right;" |Votes
! style="background-color:#E9E9E9;text-align:right;" |%
|-
|style="background-color:"|
|align=left|Mikhail Seslavinsky (incumbent)
|align=left|Our Home – Russia
|
|17.72%
|-
|style="background-color:"|
|align=left|Anatoly Tarasov
|align=left|Communist Party
|
|14.23%
|-
|style="background-color:"|
|align=left|Sergey Leskov
|align=left|Independent
|
|12.60%
|-
|style="background-color:"|
|align=left|Igor Artyomov
|align=left|Independent
|
|11.77%
|-
|style="background-color:"|
|align=left|Boris Usov
|align=left|Independent
|
|10.57%
|-
|style="background-color:#F21A29"|
|align=left|Igor Dyukov
|align=left|Trade Unions and Industrialists – Union of Labour
|
|5.68%
|-
|style="background-color:"|
|align=left|Luiza Gagut
|align=left|Liberal Democratic Party
|
|4.77%
|-
|style="background-color:#2C299A"|
|align=left|Sergey Tsvetov
|align=left|Congress of Russian Communities
|
|3.70%
|-
|style="background-color:#DD137B"|
|align=left|Yelena Sannikova
|align=left|Social Democrats
|
|2.35%
|-
|style="background-color:"|
|align=left|Aleksey Guskov
|align=left|Independent
|
|1.51%
|-
|style="background-color:#1C1A0D"|
|align=left|Aleksey Purusov
|align=left|Forward, Russia!
|
|1.36%
|-
|style="background-color:"|
|align=left|Vladimir Koterev
|align=left|Independent
|
|0.82%
|-
|style="background-color:"|
|align=left|Mikhail Nefedov
|align=left|Independent
|
|0.68%
|-
|style="background-color:#000000"|
|colspan=2 |against all
|
|9.40%
|-
| colspan="5" style="background-color:#E9E9E9;"|
|- style="font-weight:bold"
| colspan="3" style="text-align:left;" | Total
| 
| 100%
|-
| colspan="5" style="background-color:#E9E9E9;"|
|- style="font-weight:bold"
| colspan="4" |Source:
|
|}

1998

|-
! colspan=2 style="background-color:#E9E9E9;text-align:left;vertical-align:top;" |Candidate
! style="background-color:#E9E9E9;text-align:left;vertical-align:top;" |Party
! style="background-color:#E9E9E9;text-align:right;" |Votes
! style="background-color:#E9E9E9;text-align:right;" |%
|-
|style="background-color:"|
|align=left|Ardalyen Panteleyev
|align=left|Independent
|
|27.90%
|-
|style="background-color:"|
|align=left|Sergey Lisovsky
|align=left|Independent
|
|20.91%
|-
|style="background-color:"|
|align=left|Andrey Gerasimov
|align=left|Independent
|
|15.55%
|-
|style="background-color:"|
|align=left|Lidia Ugolnikova
|align=left|Independent
|
|11.95%
|-
|style="background-color:"|
|align=left|Ilya Polyashov
|align=left|Independent
|
|5.31%
|-
|style="background-color:"|
|align=left|Tamara Aksenova
|align=left|Independent
|
|1.58%
|-
|style="background-color:"|
|align=left|Valery Kravchenko
|align=left|Independent
|
|0.69%
|-
|style="background-color:"|
|align=left|Gennady Blinov
|align=left|Independent
|
|0.48%
|-
|style="background-color:"|
|align=left|Roman Murashov
|align=left|Independent
|
|0.32%
|-
|style="background-color:#000000"|
|colspan=2 |against all
|
|11.63%
|-
| colspan="5" style="background-color:#E9E9E9;"|
|- style="font-weight:bold"
| colspan="3" style="text-align:left;" | Total
| 
| 100%
|-
| colspan="5" style="background-color:#E9E9E9;"|
|- style="font-weight:bold"
| colspan="4" |Source:
|
|}

1999

|-
! colspan=2 style="background-color:#E9E9E9;text-align:left;vertical-align:top;" |Candidate
! style="background-color:#E9E9E9;text-align:left;vertical-align:top;" |Party
! style="background-color:#E9E9E9;text-align:right;" |Votes
! style="background-color:#E9E9E9;text-align:right;" |%
|-
|style="background-color:"|
|align=left|Gennady Khodyrev
|align=left|Independent
|
|32.88%
|-
|style="background-color:"|
|align=left|Sergey Leskov
|align=left|Independent
|
|16.41%
|-
|style="background-color:"|
|align=left|Alina Radchenko
|align=left|Our Home – Russia
|
|15.83%
|-
|style="background-color:"|
|align=left|Ardalyen Panteleyev (incumbent)
|align=left|Independent
|
|8.66%
|-
|style="background-color:#FF4400"|
|align=left|Andrey Tsvetkov
|align=left|Andrey Nikolayev and Svyatoslav Fyodorov Bloc
|
|1.95%
|-
|style="background-color:"|
|align=left|Irina Parfenova
|align=left|Independent
|
|1.88%
|-
|style="background-color:"|
|align=left|Aleksey Marchenko
|align=left|Liberal Democratic Party
|
|1.53%
|-
|style="background-color:"|
|align=left|Aleksandr Korimenko
|align=left|Independent
|
|1.19%
|-
|style="background-color:#084284"|
|align=left|Svetlana Shalnova
|align=left|Spiritual Heritage
|
|1.09%
|-
|style="background-color:"|
|align=left|Oleg Karpov
|align=left|Independent
|
|1.07%
|-
|style="background-color:"|
|align=left|Ivan Altyshev
|align=left|Communist Party
|
|1.00%
|-
|style="background-color:"|
|align=left|Aleksandr Gorin
|align=left|Independent
|
|0.67%
|-
|style="background-color:#000000"|
|colspan=2 |against all
|
|14.11%
|-
| colspan="5" style="background-color:#E9E9E9;"|
|- style="font-weight:bold"
| colspan="3" style="text-align:left;" | Total
| 
| 100%
|-
| colspan="5" style="background-color:#E9E9E9;"|
|- style="font-weight:bold"
| colspan="4" |Source:
|
|}

2002

|-
! colspan=2 style="background-color:#E9E9E9;text-align:left;vertical-align:top;" |Candidate
! style="background-color:#E9E9E9;text-align:left;vertical-align:top;" |Party
! style="background-color:#E9E9E9;text-align:right;" |Votes
! style="background-color:#E9E9E9;text-align:right;" |%
|-
|style="background-color:"|
|align=left|Vladimir Basov
|align=left|Independent
|
|35.66%
|-
|style="background-color:"|
|align=left|Alina Radchenko
|align=left|Independent
|
|20.42%
|-
|style="background-color:"|
|align=left|Yury Demin
|align=left|Independent
|
|9.67%
|-
|style="background-color:"|
|align=left|Eduard Savenko (Limonov)
|align=left|Independent
|
|6.58%
|-
|style="background-color:"|
|align=left|Aleksandr Kirin
|align=left|Independent
|
|5.13%
|-
|style="background-color:"|
|align=left|Viktor Kazimirov
|align=left|Independent
|
|2.06%
|-
|style="background-color:#000000"|
|colspan=2 |against all
|
|15.81%
|-
| colspan="5" style="background-color:#E9E9E9;"|
|- style="font-weight:bold"
| colspan="3" style="text-align:left;" | Total
| 
| 100%
|-
| colspan="5" style="background-color:#E9E9E9;"|
|- style="font-weight:bold"
| colspan="4" |Source:
|
|}

2003

|-
! colspan=2 style="background-color:#E9E9E9;text-align:left;vertical-align:top;" |Candidate
! style="background-color:#E9E9E9;text-align:left;vertical-align:top;" |Party
! style="background-color:#E9E9E9;text-align:right;" |Votes
! style="background-color:#E9E9E9;text-align:right;" |%
|-
|style="background-color:"|
|align=left|Vladimir Stalmakhov
|align=left|Independent
|
|25.60%
|-
|style="background-color:"|
|align=left|Vladimir Basov (incumbent)
|align=left|Communist Party
|
|16.81%
|-
|style="background-color:"|
|align=left|Alina Radchenko
|align=left|Independent
|
|13.22%
|-
|style="background-color:"|
|align=left|Gulya Khodyreva
|align=left|Rodina
|
|12.08%
|-
|style="background-color:"|
|align=left|Dmitry Shurov
|align=left|Independent
|
|10.17%
|-
|style="background-color:"|
|align=left|Aleksey Kostin
|align=left|Liberal Democratic Party
|
|2.59%
|-
|style="background-color:"|
|align=left|Aleksandr Fyodorov
|align=left|Independent
|
|1.82%
|-
|style="background-color:#C21022"|
|align=left|Ardalyen Panteleyev
|align=left|Russian Pensioners' Party-Party of Social Justice
|
|1.60%
|-
|style="background-color:"|
|align=left|Aleksandr Romanov
|align=left|Independent
|
|1.37%
|-
|style="background-color:#164C8C"|
|align=left|Aleksandr Linev
|align=left|United Russian Party Rus'
|
|0.53%
|-
|style="background-color:"|
|align=left|Yury Bratukhin
|align=left|Independent
|
|0.36%
|-
|style="background-color:"|
|align=left|Artyom Nasledskov
|align=left|Independent
|
|0.26%
|-
|style="background-color:#000000"|
|colspan=2 |against all
|
|12.11%
|-
| colspan="5" style="background-color:#E9E9E9;"|
|- style="font-weight:bold"
| colspan="3" style="text-align:left;" | Total
| 
| 100%
|-
| colspan="5" style="background-color:#E9E9E9;"|
|- style="font-weight:bold"
| colspan="4" |Source:
|
|}

Notes

References 

Obsolete Russian legislative constituencies
Politics of Nizhny Novgorod Oblast